Hans J. Jorgensen Barn is a historic building located in Kimballton, Iowa, United States.  Its significance is derived from its association with Jorgensen, who was the instrumental in the founding and early growth of the town, a Danish immigrant community.  The barn is a pyramidal roof variant of the Square Hipped Roof Barn.  Built in 1908, it is the only barn of this type that remains in the Danish Settlement area.  The concrete blocks used for the foundation and for the adjacent silo, which a part of this historic nomination, were locally produced in a Danish-influenced industry.  The two-story heavy-timber structure utilized mortise and tenon construction for the animal stalls and the supports for the hay loft.  The barn was listed on the National Register of Historic Places in 1991.

References

Infrastructure completed in 1908
Kimballton, Iowa
Buildings and structures in Audubon County, Iowa
National Register of Historic Places in Audubon County, Iowa
Barns on the National Register of Historic Places in Iowa
1908 establishments in Iowa